Scoundrels is an American comedy-drama television series that aired on the ABC network. It is based on the New Zealand TV series Outrageous Fortune. The one-hour comedy-drama premiered on Sunday, June 20, 2010 at 9 pm.  The eight-episode run ended on August 15, 2010.

Plot
Cheryl West is a middle-aged woman with four children: twin brothers Logan and Cal, and daughters Heather, an aspiring model and Hope, the youngest and an aspiring filmmaker. After Cheryl's career criminal husband Wolf is sentenced to five years in prison, Cheryl forces her family to quit its criminal activities. However, even from jail, Wolf interferes with her attempts to reform their family.

Cast
Virginia Madsen as Cheryl West
David James Elliott as Wolfgang "Wolf" West
Patrick Flueger as Logan and Calvin "Cal" West (twins)
Leven Rambin as Heather West
Vanessa Marano as Hope West
Carlos Bernard as Sergeant Mack

Development and production
The series is based on the New Zealand TV series Outrageous Fortune, which was created by James Griffin and Rachel Lang. (See also "Honest" starring Amanda Redman - a UK version of the New Zealand series which transmitted on ITV in 2008.)   Lyn Greene and Richard Levine wrote the pilot of Scoundrels for American television, and they serve as the series show runners. ABC green-lit the series in January 2010 with an eight episode order.

Madsen was cast in early February, followed by Flueger. Rambin came on board in late February, along with Neal McDonough, who was originally cast as Wolf West. Filming began March 16, 2010 in Albuquerque, New Mexico. Three days into the shoot, McDonough was replaced by David James Elliot due to McDonough's strict religious beliefs and refusal to film sex scenes.

This was ABC's second attempt at reformatting Outrageous Fortune for an American audience. In 2008, a pilot named Good Behavior wasn't picked up by the network.

Reception
The series pilot "And Jill Came Tumbling After" received mixed reviews with The Boston Herald claiming the show was "wicked fun" and praised the show's cast. A reviewer from The Boston Globe was quoted to say "Not a single one of the characters were funny enough, or touching enough, to make me want to see more of them. If the Wests were thrown in jail, I’d be tempted to throw away the key." On the review collaboration site Metacritic, Scoundrels currently holds 56% (mixed or average) based on 18 critic reviews. The show's second episode Mary, Mary, Quite Contrary got overall a better response than the pilot with it earning positive reviews. TV Fanatic gave the episode 3/5 saying "the episode was an improvement on the pilot, with the characters developing and the show overall finding its tone and footing a bit." and "there were decent dramatic moments and good laughs in “Mary, Mary, Quite Contrary."

Cancellation
On October 24, 2010 it was revealed on ABC's Twitter page that Scoundrels would not be returning for another season.

Episodes

Ratings

U.S. Nielsen ratings

Weekly ratings

Seasonal ratings

Canadian ratings

References

External links

2010s American drama television series
2010 American television series debuts
2010 American television series endings
American Broadcasting Company original programming
American television series based on New Zealand television series
English-language television shows
Television series by South Pacific Pictures
Television series by ABC Studios